Ydre Nørrebro (English: Outer Nørrebro) is an area in Copenhagen, Denmark. It is the part of the district of Nørrebro located farthest from the City Centre. It covers an area of 2.10 km², has a population of 41,497 and a population density of 19,733 per km², making it the most densely populated district in Copenhagen and all of Denmark. Approximately 25% of the inhabitants are immigrants, in some areas the immigrants population is 50%. Many shops are run by Middle Eastern and South Asian immigrants which gives the area a very multi-ethnic atmosphere.

Neighboring city districts are as follows:
 to the southeast are Indre Nørrebro and Indre Østerbro
 to the northeast is Ydre Østerbro
 to the northwest is Bispebjerg
 to the southwest is Frederiksberg municipality, which is not a part of Copenhagen municipality but rather an enclave surrounded by the municipality

Colloquially, the Ydre Nørrebro and the Indre Nørrebro are commonly referred to as Nørrebro.

External links 

 City of Copenhagen’s statistical office
 

Copenhagen city districts